Sorkh Degar (also Romanized as Sorkh Degār; also known as Sorkh Dagān, Sorkh Degāl, Sorkh Dekāl, and Sorkh Dogān) is a village in Kahnuk Rural District, Irandegan District, Khash County, Sistan and Baluchestan Province, Iran. At the 2006 census, its population was 16, in 5 families.

References 

Populated places in Khash County